Ciara O'Callaghan is an Irish actress. She appeared in The Clinic and Sherlock Holmes and the Baker Street Irregulars. She is best known for her portrayal of Yvonne Gleeson on the Irish soap opera Fair City. She first came into the show in 1998 as Yvonne Doyle. She left in 2003 and returned in 2008. She also left again in 2014. She also appeared in Mrs. Brown's Boys D'Movie, Insatiable, and the RTE drama Striking Out. In 2009, she appeared in one episode of The Restaurant.

Filmography

Film

Television

See also
 List of longest-serving soap opera actors#Ireland

References

External links

Living people
Actresses from Dublin (city)
Irish soap opera actresses
Irish television actresses
21st-century Irish actresses
1972 births